Philip Michael Bath  (born 7 October 1956) is a British clinician scientist. He is Stroke Association Professor of Stroke Medicine at the Stroke Trials Unit within the University of Nottingham. He specialises clinically in stroke and academically has established large-scale trials in treating and preventing stroke. Bath worked as a junior doctor before specialising in general medicine, stroke and hypertension. He is an Honorary Consultant Physician at Nottingham University Hospitals NHS Trust. He has spent his academic career at St George's, University of London, King's College London and University of Nottingham.

Early life and education
Bath was educated at Dulwich College in London, U.K. and studied medicine at St Thomas's Hospital Medical School, now GKT School of Medical Education. graduating with a Bachelor of Science (BSc) degree in Physiology in 1979, and Bachelor of Medicine, Bachelor of Surgery (MB BS) in 1982. He undertook research for a Doctor of Medicine (M.D.) degree, completing it in 1992 and winning the Rogers prize at University of London. His thesis was titled "Human monocyte behaviour and interactions with endothelium : aspects of physiology and pathology". He was awarded his Doctor of Science (D.Sc.) from the University of Nottingham in 2015, entitled "Management of blood pressure after stroke".

Career
Having worked as a junior doctor, Bath specialised in internal medicine. In 1986 he became a Member of the Royal Colleges of Physicians of the United Kingdom (MRCP), and in 1998 a Fellow of the Royal College of Physicians (FRCP). From 1991 to 1993, Bath was a lecturer at the Blood Pressure Unit at St George's, University of London where he worked for the distinguished hypertensionologist, Professor Graham MacGregor. He moved in 1993 to King's College Hospital Medical School, London, now GKT School of Medical Education as Senior Lecturer, and Honorary Consultant Physician at King's College Hospital where he established the Acute Stroke Unit. In 1998, he moved to the University of Nottingham as Stroke Association Professor of Stroke Medicine, and Head of the Division of Stroke Medicine. His Division was integrated into the Division of Clinical Neuroscience, in 2013, which he headed until 2021. He is an Honorary Consultant Physician at Nottingham University Hospitals NHS Trust where he works on the Hyperacute Stroke Unit.

Research
Bath is recognised as an expert in stroke and clinical trials. His current research is focused on the hyperacute treatment and prevention of stroke. As a Clinical Trialist, he has been Chief Investigator of five phase III/IV trials: TAIST, ENOS, STEPS, TARDIS, and RIGHT-2. He is Chief Investigator of the ongoing National Institute for Health Research (NIHR) HTA-funded Pharyngeal Electrical stimulation for Acute Stroke dysphagia Trial (PhEAST).

Honours
In 2016 Bath was elected a Fellow of the Academy of Medical Sciences (FMedSci) and appointed as Senior Investigator at the NIHR. He is also a Fellow of the European Stroke Organisation (2005) and American Heart Association (2014). He received the Feinberg Award for Excellence in Clinical Stroke from the American Heart Association in 2016, the President's Award from the British Association of Stroke Physicians (BASP) in 2019, and the President's Award from the World Stroke Organization (WSO) in 2021.

References 

20th-century British medical doctors
21st-century British medical doctors
1956 births
Living people
NIHR Senior Investigators